Marek Galiński may refer to:

 Marek Galiński (cyclist) (1974–2014), Polish mountain biker
 Marek Galiński (wrestler) (1951–1999), Polish wrestler